This is a list of Washington county courthouses.

External links
 Washington State Courthouse Tour
 County Courthouses of Washington State

 
 
Courthouses
Washington